Albert Benitz (17 November 1904 – 11 March 1979) was a German cinematographer who worked on more than ninety films. He also directed the 1949 film Das Fräulein und der Vagabund. During the 1940s, he was under contract to Terra Film and worked with Leni Riefenstahl during the era.

Selected filmography

References

Bibliography
 Rainer Rother. Leni Riefenstahl: The Seduction of Genius. A&C Black, 2003.

External links

1904 births
1979 deaths
German cinematographers
Film people from Freiburg im Breisgau